One Foot in the Past is a British television series on BBC 2 that ran from 1993 to 2000. It considered the cultural heritage and history of Britain. Each programme ran for 30 minutes.

Presenters included Kirsty Wark and also:
 Joan Bakewell
 Roger Bowdler
 Dan Cruickshank
 Philippa Gregory
 Lucinda Lambton
 Jonathan Meades

References
"One Foot in the Past Special: Brunel" (1995) 73 Structural Engineer 356 Google Books
(2002) 216 Architects' Journal 20 Google Books
"One Foot in the Past" (1995) BBC Worldwide, Issues 33-38 Google Books
"One Foot in the Past" (1996) BBC Worldwide, Issues 39–43, p 94 Google Books
"One Foot in the Past" in "Television" (2000) 107 RIBA Journal 27 & 35 (Issues 1–6) Google Books 
"One Foot in the Past" in "Television" (1998) 105 RIBA Journal 137 Google Books

External links

Information from the British Film Institute

1993 British television series debuts
BBC television documentaries
Cultural history of the United Kingdom
Documentary television series about architecture
English culture
2000 British television series endings